Douglas Evans or Doug Evans may refer to:

Doug Evans (American football) (born 1970), retired American football player
Doug Evans (ice hockey) (born 1963), retired Canadian ice hockey player
Doug Evans (fighter) (born 1980), American lightweight mixed martial artist
Douglas Evans (actor) (1904–1968), American actor
Douglas Evans (children's author)